Ed Lee Williams (born March 14, 1991) is an American football wide receiver who is currently a free agent. He played college football at Fort Hays State. Williams was signed by the Green Bay Packers as an undrafted free agent in 2015.

Professional career
After going undrafted in the 2015 NFL Draft, Williams signed with the Green Bay Packers on August 3, 2015. On September 5, 2015, he was released by the Packers during final team cuts. Williams was signed to the Packers' practice squad on September 8, 2015. On January 18, 2016, he was re-signed by the Packers after finishing the season on the practice squad. Williams was released by the Packers on August 29, 2016.

References

External links
 
 Fort Hays State Tigers bio
 

1991 births
Living people
Players of American football from Tampa, Florida
Players of Canadian football from Tampa, Florida
American football wide receivers
Fort Hays State Tigers football players
Green Bay Packers players
Hamilton Tiger-Cats players